Chahar Khaneh Sar may refer to:
 Chahar Khaneh Sar-e Bala
 Chahar Khaneh Sar-e Pain